Teoman "Teo" Alibegović (born January 11, 1967) is Bosnian-Slovenian former professional basketball player, coach, and manager. With 990 points scored, he is the second all-time top scorer of the senior Slovenian national basketball team.

Early years
Alibegović was born in Zenica, SR Bosnia-Herzegovina, SFR Yugoslavia. Later, he moved with his family to Jesenice, SR Slovenia, where he attended primary school, and started playing basketball with the junior teams of KK Jesenice. In 1982, he joined KK Olimpija's youth categories.  After two years, he moved from Ljubljana to Sarajevo, where he played for what was then one of the top clubs in the Yugoslav First Basketball League, KK Bosna.

College career
In 1988, Alibegović began attending Oregon State University. After 3 years, he graduated with degrees in business and communication.

Professional career
The Quad City Thunder selected Alibegović in the 1991 Continental Basketball Association (CBA) draft, but he never played for them. However, in his first pro season, he played with the CBA team Yakima Sun Kings. Teo joined the Italian club Fortitudo Bologna, at the end of the 1991–92 season. 

From 1993 to 1996, he played with the German club Alba Berlin, helping them win the FIBA Korać Cup championship. Before the 1996–97 season, he signed with Turkish club Ülkerspor, but after six months, he was back in Italy, this time with Trieste. The next season, 1997–98, he played with Cáceres CB in Spain. For the 1998–99 season, he returned to Trieste. From 1999 to 2002, he played for the Italian club Snaidero Udine. In his last pro year, he played in Greece, playing with Ionikos NF.

National team career
At the youth level, Alibegović played for the Yugoslavia Under-18 and Under-19 national teams, which won the 1986 FIBA Europe Under-18 Championship, and the 1987 FIBA Under-19 World Cup. Alibegović was a member of the senior men's Slovenian national basketball team, from 1991 to 2001. With Slovenia, he played at four EuroBaskets (1993, 1995, 1997, 2001). With Slovenia's senior national team, he played in 52 games, and scored 990 points, which made him the all-time top scorer of Slovenia's senior national basketball team.

Coaching career
Before the 2003–04 season, Alibegović was appointed the head coach of Udine. In 2005, he was the general manager of Fortitudo Bologna. He was the head coach of Leagea Scafati, from December 2006 to November 2007. From 2008 to 2010, he was head consultant of Udine.

Personal life
Alibegović has three sons: Mirza (1992), Amar (1995), and Denis (1999), who are also basketball players.
Mirza played for Brescia in Italy, where Denis played for the Stella Azzurra Roma youth teams. Amar also played for the Roman side teams, before he chose to play college basketball with the St. John's Red Storm. Amar now plays professionally in Italy. His nephew Luka Garza played for the Iowa Hawkeyes, and was a first-team All-America and Big Ten Conference Player of the Year in 2020. Luka Garza was selected in the 2021 NBA Draft by the Detroit Pistons.

External links
 Teoman Alibegović at Diversity Max Llc.
 Teoman Alibegović legabasket.it 
 Teoman Alibegović at acb.com 
 Teoman Alibegović at FIBA.com
 Teoman Alibegović at fibaeurope.com
 Teoman Alibegović at TBLStat.net

1967 births
Living people
Alba Berlin players
Centers (basketball)
Fenerbahçe men's basketball players
Ionikos N.F. B.C. players
Lega Basket Serie A players
Liga ACB players
Oregon State Beavers men's basketball players
Yakima Sun Kings players
Fortitudo Pallacanestro Bologna players
Pallalcesto Amatori Udine players
Pallacanestro Trieste players
Sportspeople from Zenica
Power forwards (basketball)
Slovenian expatriate basketball people in Italy
Slovenian expatriate basketball people in Spain
Slovenian expatriate basketball people in the United States
Yugoslav expatriate sportspeople in the United States
Slovenian men's basketball players
Sportspeople from Jesenice, Jesenice
Bosniaks of Bosnia and Herzegovina
Slovenian people of Bosniak descent
Slovenian people of Bosnia and Herzegovina descent